The Rural Municipality of Senlac No. 411 is a rural municipality (RM) in the Canadian province of Saskatchewan within Census Division No. 13 and  Division No. 6. Located in the west-central portion of the province, it is adjacent to the Alberta boundary.

History 
The RM of Senlac No. 411 incorporated as a rural municipality on January 1, 1913.

Geography 
The RM of Senlac is located along the western border of Saskatchewan in a region called the Prairie Pothole Region of North America, which extends throughout three Canadian provinces and five U.S. states. It is also within Palliser's Triangle and the Great Plains ecoregion. The RM is characterised by potholes, small lakes, rolling hills, and grasslands. Along the very northern edge of the RM are the Manitou Sand Hills.

Communities and localities 
The following urban municipalities are surrounded by the RM.

Villages
 Senlac

The following unincorporated communities are within the RM.

Localities
 Rutland
 Winter
 Yonker

Lakes and rivers
The following is a list of notable lakes and rivers in the RM:
Little Manitou Lake (not to be confused with the Little Manitou Lake in the eastern part of Saskatchewan)
Suffern Lake
Freshwater Lake
Reflex Lakes
Drake Lake
Morse Lake
Devitt Lake
Eyehill Creek

Suffern Lake Regional Park 
Suffern Lake Regional Park  was established in 1967 as a centennial project on a small lake called Suffern Lake. Suffern Lake was originally named Fish Lake but was renamed Suffern Lake after Jack Suffern, who was the forest ranger for the area from 1914 to 1945.

In 1975, a second section of the park was added on the north-west corner of Manitou Lake. In 2019, that section became its own park called Big Manitou Regional Park in 2019.

Demographics 

Government 
The RM of Senlac No. 411 is governed by an elected municipal council and an appointed administrator that meets on the second Wednesday of every month. The reeve of the RM is Owen Mawbey while its administrator is Paulina Herle. The RM's office is located in Senlac.

Transportation 
The following is a list of Saskatchewan highways in the RM:
Saskatchewan Highway 787—serving Senlac, SK and Winter
Saskatchewan Highway 680
Saskatchewan Highway 14
Saskatchewan Highway 675—serving Winter, SK
Saskatchewan Highway 17—runs along the Saskatchewan / Alberta border

See also 
List of rural municipalities in Saskatchewan

References 

Senlac

Division No. 13, Saskatchewan